Floyd Bates Barnum (March 17, 1892 – February 1965) was an American football coach He was the fourth head football coach at Jamestown College—now known as the University of Jamestown—in Jamestown, North Dakota, serving for one season, in 1921, and compiling a record of 0–2–1.

Head coaching record

References

1892 births
1965 deaths
Jamestown Jimmies football coaches
Hillsdale College alumni
People from Hillsdale County, Michigan
Coaches of American football from Michigan